Dance in the Vampire Bund is a Japanese manga series written and illustrated by Nozomu Tamaki.  The series and its spinoffs were serialized in Monthly Comic Flapper before being collected into tankōbon volumes and published by Media Factory.  Seven Seas Entertainment published the volumes in the United States.

Dance in the Vampire Bund
The original Dance in the Vampire Bund manga was serialized in Monthly Comic Flapper from December 5, 2005 to September 5, 2012.  Seven Seas Entertainment licensed the series in 2007.  The series was collected into 14 volumes.

Omnibus
Seven Seas compiled the series into five omnibus volumes between 2012 and 2014.

Dive in the Vampire Bund
Dive in the Vampire Bund was published between 2010 and 2013.  Seven Seas licensed it in 2010.  It was collected into two tankōbon volumes.

Dance in the Vampire Bund: The Memories of Sledgehammer
Dance in the Vampire Bund: The Memories of Sledgehammer ran in Comic Flapper between November 5, 2012, and November 5, 2013.  Seven Seas licensed the series in October 2013.  The series was published as three collected volumes.

Omnibus
Seven Seas published the series as one collected omnibus volume in 2015.

Dance in the Vampire Bund II: Scarlet Order
Dance in the Vampire Bund II: Scarlet Order was published in Comic Flapper between December 5, 2013, and April 4, 2015.  Seven Seas licensed the series in June 2014.  It was published as four separate volumes.

Dance in the Vampire Bund: Age of Scarlet Order
Dance in the Vampire Bund: Age of Scarlet Order began serialization on TO Books' Nico Nico Seiga-based online magazine Comic Corona on May 28, 2018.  Seven Seas announced their license to the title in March 2019.

Chapters not yet in tankōbon format
The following chapters have been serialized on the Comic Corona website, but have not yet been collected into a tankōbon volume:

Dōjinshi
Tadano published a number of Dance in the Vampire Bund dōjinshi at Comiket; these were collected and released as two separate volumes by Seven Seas.

References

External links
  
  at Seven Seas Entertainment
 

Dance in the Vampire Bund